The Firearms Act 1968 (c 27) is a UK Act of Parliament, controlling use and possession of firearms.

Since 1968, the act has been extensively amended. Following the Hungerford massacre, the Firearms (Amendment) Act 1988 extended the class of prohibited weapons. Following the Dunblane school massacre, two acts were passed, the Firearms (Amendment) Act 1997 and, after the general election that year, the Firearms (Amendment) (No. 2) Act 1997, which in effect banned almost all handguns. The Policing and Crime Act 2017 brought clarity to aspects of the act, following a recommendation from the Law Commission.

Prohibited Firearms and Ammunition 

Section five of Part One of the Act states that a prohibited firearm is one which;
Fires more than one ammunition when the trigger is pressed 

Is a self-loading or pump-action rifled gun except when chambered for .22 rim-fire cartridges;
Has a barrel less than 30 centimetres in length or is less than 60 centimetres in length overall, except air weapons, muzzle-loading gun or signalling firearms
Is a self-loading or pump-action smooth-bore gun which is not an air weapon or chambered for .22 rim-fire cartridges and has a barrel less than 24 inches in length or less than 40 inches in length overall
Is a smooth-bore revolver gun except chambered for 9mm. rim-fire cartridges or a muzzle-loading gun
Is a rocket launcher or mortar except when designed for line-throwing, pyrotechnic purposes, or for signalling 
Air firearm which uses a self-contained gas cartridge system, i.e. the Brocock system of pump-up cartridges, each with their own pellet, but not a CO2 bulb system.
Weapon of whatever description designed or adapted for the discharge of any noxious liquid, gas or other, presumably including sound or light that may cause injury
For ammunition it is prohibited if it; 
Are designed to explode on or immediately before impact
Contain any such noxious item
Consists of a missile
Prohibited firearms and ammunition may only be possessed, purchased, sold, gifted or manufactured with authority from the government; as enacted this was from the Defence Council, as of 2020 this is from the Secretary of State.

See also 
Firearms regulation in the United Kingdom

References

External links

United Kingdom Acts of Parliament 1968
Gun politics in the United Kingdom